Oti is a prefecture located in the Savanes Region of Togo. The prefecture seat is located in Sansanné-Mango.

The cantons (or subdivisions) of Oti include Mango, Gando, Mogou, Koumongou, Nagbéni, Tchanaga, Takpamba, Galangashie, Barkoissi, Kountoiré, Nali,  Faré,  Loko,  Sagbièbou, Tchamonga, Sadori.

References 

Prefectures of Togo
Savanes Region, Togo